Lawrence Charles Hoffman (July 18, 1878 – December 29, 1948) was an American third baseman in Major League Baseball. He played for the Chicago Orphans in 1901. He was born in Chicago, Illinois.

References

External links

1878 births
1948 deaths
Major League Baseball third basemen
Chicago Orphans players
Des Moines Hawkeyes players
Meriden Silverites players
Joliet Standards players
Springfield Foot Trackers players
Springfield Hustlers players
Portland Giants players
Mobile Sea Gulls players
Savannah Indians players
Atlanta Crackers players
Shreveport Pirates (baseball) players
Waco Navigators players
Green Bay Bays players
Racine Belles (1909–1915) players
Baseball players from Chicago